The Lakeland Highlanders were a minor league baseball team, based in Lakeland, Florida from 1919 through 1926. It was a charter member of the Florida State League and won the league title in 1926.

Notable alumni

 Tommy Leach (1924)

References
Baseball Reference

Baseball teams established in 1919
Defunct minor league baseball teams
Defunct Florida State League teams
Sports in Lakeland, Florida
Defunct baseball teams in Florida
1919 establishments in Florida
1926 disestablishments in Florida
Sports clubs disestablished in 1926
Baseball teams disestablished in 1926